Edward James Loxton KC (11 October 1864 – 17 February 1935) was an Australian politician.

He was born at Neutral Bay to Thomas Loxton and Lucinda Jane, née Forster. After attending Sydney Grammar School and the University of Sydney (BA 1886, MA 1888), he was articled to the solicitors' firm Allen & Allen, qualifying but not seeking admission as a solicitor. In 1891 he married Jane Rosa Marshall, with whom he had five children. He was called to the Bar in 1892 and practised in the Equity Court. In the late 1910s he became active in political campaigns, strongly supporting conscription and 6 o'clock closing times. He was elected in 1920 to the New South Wales Legislative Assembly as an independent Nationalist member for Ryde; he joined the Nationalist Party in 1922. Loxton served until 1925; he died in Sydney in 1935.

References

 

1864 births
1935 deaths
Independent members of the Parliament of New South Wales
Nationalist Party of Australia members of the Parliament of New South Wales
Members of the New South Wales Legislative Assembly
Australian King's Counsel
University of Sydney alumni
Politicians from Sydney